The Franklin (or Francklyn) Baronetcy, of Moor Park in the County of Hertford, was a title in the Baronetage of England.  It was created on 16 October 1660 for Richard Franklin.  The title became extinct on the death of the third Baronet in 1728.

Franklin baronets, of Moor Park (1660)

Sir Richard Franklin, 1st Baronet (1630–1685)
Sir Richard Franklin, 2nd Baronet (– 1695)
Sir Thomas Franklin, 3rd Baronet (c. 1656 – 1728)

References

Extinct baronetcies in the Baronetage of England